My Kingdom for a Cook is a 1943 American comedy film directed by Richard Wallace, which stars Charles Coburn, Marguerite Chapman, and Bill Carter.

Synopsis
A visiting British emissary on a goodwill tour of the United States struggles to replace his long-standing cook when he is unable to join him on the journey.

Cast list
 Charles Coburn as Rudyard Morley
 Marguerite Chapman as Pamela Morley
 Bill Carter as Mike Scott
 Isobel Elsom as Lucille Scott
 Edward Gargan as Duke
 Mary Wickes as Agnes Willoughby
 Almira Sessions as Hattie
 Eddy Waller as Sam Thornton
 Ralph Peters as Pretty Boy Peterson
 Ivan Simpson as Professor Harlow
 Betty Brewer as Jerry
 Melville Cooper as Angus Sheffield
 Kathleen Howard as Mrs. Carter
 Charles Halton as Oliver Bradbury
 Andrew Tombes as Abe Mason
 Norma Varden as Margaret
 William Austin as Brooks
 Constance Worth as Auxiliary girl
 Reginald Sheffield as English reporter
 Sterling Campbell as British wing commander
 Ethel May Halls as Mrs. Mason
 Jessie Arnold as Mrs. Forsythe

References

External links
 

1943 films
1943 comedy films
American comedy films
Films directed by Richard Wallace
Columbia Pictures films
American black-and-white films
1940s English-language films
1940s American films